Amanda Ross may refer to:
Amanda Ross (television executive), British television executive
Amanda Ross (equestrian) (born 1973), Australian three-day eventing equestrian
Amanda McKittrick Ros, pen-name of Anna Margaret Ross (1860–1939), Irish writer
Amanda Ross-Ho (born 1975) American artist